Skamokawa is an unincorporated community in Wahkiakum County, Washington, United States.  Skamokawa is a Chinook term for smoke or fog on the water.

Skamokawa rests on the banks of the Columbia River, and on WA 4.  The town includes a post office, restaurant, and general store, along with a nearby historical museum and covered bridge.  It is a local center for kayaking and fishing.

References

 Best Places profile of Skamokawa

Unincorporated communities in Wahkiakum County, Washington
Unincorporated communities in Washington (state)
Washington (state) populated places on the Columbia River
Chinook Jargon place names